Charles Levy (born January 7, 1972) is a former professional American football running back who spent five seasons with the Arizona Cardinals and the San Francisco 49ers in the National Football League. In 2009, Levy was arrested on suspicion of driving under the influence of drugs and possessing marijuana. Police in Gilbert, Arizona said that the 37-year-old Levy was taken into custody on October 14, 2009 five days after he was arrested on an outstanding warrant for failing to appear in court. That case involved an October 2008 charge of speeding in a construction zone and driving on a suspended license.

References

1972 births
Living people
Players of American football from Torrance, California
American football running backs
Arizona Wildcats football players
Arizona Cardinals players
San Francisco 49ers players